USS LST-713 was an   built for the United States Navy during World War II.

The ship was laid down on 3 June 1944 at the Jefferson Boat & Machine Company in Jeffersonville, Indiana; she was launched on 11 July 1944 and commissioned on 7 August 1944.

In February 1945, LST-713 was lastly seen and photographed three times off Iwo Jima, Japan during the invasion.

Service history
During World War II, LST-713 was assigned to the Asiatic-Pacific Theater.  She participated in two operations: the Battle of Iwo Jima in February 1945, and the assault and occupation of Okinawa Gunto, which took place from April to June 1945. Following the war, LST-713 performed occupation duty in the Far East until February 1946.

She returned to the United States and was decommissioned on 20 June 1946, and struck from the Navy List on 31 July that same year.  On 21 May 1948, the ship was sold to the Bethlehem Steel Corporation of Bethlehem, Pennsylvania, and subsequently scrapped.

Awards
USS LST-713 earned two battle stars for World War II service.

1 Combat Action Ribbon

1 American Campaign Medal

2 Asiatic-Pacific Campaigns Medal

1 World War 2 Victory Medal

1 Navy Occupation Medal

References 

 
 

LST-542-class tank landing ships
World War II amphibious warfare vessels of the United States
Ships built in Jeffersonville, Indiana
1944 ships